State Route 290 (SR 290) is a state highway in Humboldt County, Nevada.  It serves to connect U.S. Route 95 to the community of Paradise Valley. The road was originally established as State Route 8B by the early 1930s.

Route description
From the junction, the highway heads northeasterly through a valley known as Paradise Valley while paralleling Martin Creek, a fork of the Little Humboldt River. Once inside the town, SR 290 turns east on Bridge Street to come to its northern terminus on a small bridge over Big Cottonwood Creek.

History

SR 290 was originally numbered as State Route 8B. SR 8B had been established as a graveled road by 1932, approximately following the alignment of the present-day highway. The route was completely paved by 1940.  No major changes were made to State Route 8B during its existence. The route number remained active until the renumbering of Nevada's state highways that began on July 1, 1976. SR 8B became the present-day State Route 290 in that process, a change first seen on the 1978–1979 version of the state's highway map.

Major intersections

See also

References

290
Transportation in Humboldt County, Nevada